Matthew Allen Geiger (born September 10, 1969) is an American former professional National Basketball Association player who played at the center position.

Collegiate career
Geiger played for Countryside High School in Clearwater, Florida and was recruited to play college basketball at Auburn University. He played with Auburn before transferring to Georgia Tech for more playing time.

NBA career
His successful college career led Geiger to be selected by the Miami Heat in the second round (42nd pick overall) of the 1992 NBA Draft. He played in the NBA for 10 seasons from 1992–2002 with 3 teams: Miami Heat, Charlotte Hornets, and Philadelphia 76ers.

In the summer of 2000, Matt Geiger's refusal to waive a $5 million trade kicker clause in his contract stopped a four-team deal between Philadelphia, the Hornets, the Detroit Pistons and the L.A. Lakers that would have sent All-Star player Allen Iverson to the Pistons. He was suspended for 2 games during the 2000–01 season for a violation of the NBA/NBPA's steroid policy.

Geiger signed a contract in 2001 with the Philadelphia 76ers but knee injuries forced him to retire in 2002 after a ten-year career. For his career, he averaged 9.2 points and 5.7 rebounds per game.

Personal life
Geiger resides in Tarpon Springs, Florida where he is a real estate investor. His  estate, reported as the largest in the county, sold on January 3, 2011 for 8 million dollars. The Punisher used this home as the residence of John Travolta's character Mr. Saint.

In January 1992, during Geiger's senior year at Georgia Tech, his fraternal twin Mark Geiger was diagnosed with Hodgkin's disease at the age of 22. Because his brother lost his hair during chemotherapy, Matt Geiger shaved his head during his NBA career in support of his brother.

References

1969 births
Living people
American men's basketball players
Auburn Tigers men's basketball players
Basketball players from Florida
Basketball players from Massachusetts
Centers (basketball)
Charlotte Hornets players
Georgia Tech Yellow Jackets men's basketball players
Miami Heat draft picks
Miami Heat players
Philadelphia 76ers players
Sportspeople from Clearwater, Florida
Sportspeople from Salem, Massachusetts